A private line is telephony service using dedicated circuits.

Private Line may also refer to:
 Private Line (band), a Finnish hard rock band
 Private Line (album), by Gerald Levert
 "Private Line" (song), the debut single